Wundwin is a town in the Mandalay Region of central Myanmar. 

Wundwin, alongside Amarapura, is a major domestic center of traditional acheik weaving, although in recent years, cheaper factory-produced imitations from China and India have significantly disrupted Myanmar's traditional cottage industry.

Sources

External links
Satellite map at Maplandia.com

Populated places in Mandalay Region
Township capitals of Myanmar